Strunk is a surname. Notable people with the surname include:

 Amy Adams Strunk (born 1955), American businesswoman
 Oliver Strunk (1901–1980), American musicologist
 William Strunk Jr. (1869–1946), American professor and author